The Midland Highway is a major rural highway linking major towns in Victoria, beginning from Geelong and winding through country Victoria in a large arc through the cities of Ballarat, Bendigo and Shepparton, eventually reaching Mansfield at the foothills of the Victorian Alps.

History
The passing of the Highways and Vehicles Act of 1924 through the Parliament of Victoria provided for the declaration of State Highways, roads two-thirds financed by the State government through the Country Roads Board (later VicRoads). The Midland Highway was declared a State Highway in 1933, cobbled together from roads between Geelong and Ballarat, between Shepparton and Benalla, and between Benalla to the turn-off road to Maindample in Barjang (for a total of 114 miles); before this declaration, these roads were referred to as Geelong-Ballarat Road, Shepparton-Nalinga Road and Benalla-Mansfield Road. In the 1947/48 financial year, another section from Shepparton via Stanhope to Elmore was added, along the former Shepparton-Elmore Road; with the realignment of the Northern Highway south of Elmore running to Kilmore instead of to Bendigo declared at the same time, the previous alignment of the Northern Highway between Elmore and Bendigo was also added to the Midland Highway. In the 1959/60 financial year, the last section from Ballarat via Creswick and Daylesford to Castlemaine was added, along the former Ballarat-Creswick Road, Creswick-Daylesford Road and Castlemaine-Daylesford Roads. With the deviation of the Calder Highway past Castlemaine declared at the same time, the previous alignment of the Calder Highway between Castlemaine and Harcourt was also added to the Midland Highway. With the highway running concurrent with Calder Highway between Harcourt and Bendigo, the Midland Highway had finally achieved its present-day alignment at this stage. The Midland Link Highway was later declared in June 1983 along the former Maindample-Benalla Road.

The Midland Highway also had a separate, southern section through South Gippsland, declared in 1939, from Morwell through Boolarra to Welshpool (with the intention to be linked up in the future with the existing highway at Mansfield), along the former Morwell-Mirboo Road; this appears to have been extended to Port Welshpool by 1972, and a 9.6 km portion of highway through Yinnar was declared the Midland Freeway in 1975, despite being only a single-carriageway road. The highway was re-routed with a 20 km deviation from south of Yinnar via Churchill to the Princes Highway in eastern Morwell in 1976; the former alignment is now known as Yinnar Road and Brodribb Road (the latter signed route C468 in 1998). This section, eventually 88km long, was eventually stripped of both freeway and State Highway status: from south of Grand Ridge Road to Port Welshpool in August 1990, and from north of Grand Ridge Road to Morwell in September 1990 - replaced as a north-south route through South Gippsland by the recently-declared Strzelecki and Hyland Highways - and renamed into its current constituent parts (Monash Way, Budgeree Road, Woorarra Road and Port Welshpool Road), with the section between Wonyip and Albert River Road incorporated back into the Grand Ridge Road.

The alignment of the highway through southern Ballarat was altered in May 1990: previously running north through Buninyong along Warrenheip Street, Geelong Road, Main Road and along the Western Highway to meet its northern half at Doveton Street North, it was re-aligned to its current route running west through Buninyong along Buninyong-Sebastopol Road via Sebastopol and then along Skipton Street and Doveton Street South (the former alignment of the Glenelg Highway, truncated back to Sebastopol at the same time) to meet its northern half directly at Sturt Street; the former alignment is now known as Ballarat-Buninyong Road (signed route C294 in 1998).

The Midland Highway was signed as State Route 149 between Geelong and Benalla, State Route 153 between Benalla and Barjang, Alternative State Route 153 between Barjang and Mansfield, and State Route 190 between Morwell and Port Welshpool in 1986; with Victoria's conversion to the newer alphanumeric system in the late 1990s, this was replaced by route A300 between Geelong and Benalla, route B300 between Benalla and Barjang, and route C518 between Barjang and Mansfield; despite highway status being removed between Morwell and Port Welshpool, the former highway alignment continued to be signed as State Route 190 until the change-over to the new alphanumeric system, when all traces of the former route were removed. Midland Link Highway was signed State Route 153 between Barjang and Maindample in 1986, and was later replaced by route B300.

The passing of the Road Management Act 2004 granted the responsibility of overall management and development of Victoria's major arterial roads to VicRoads: in 2004, VicRoads re-declared the Midland Link Highway (Arterial #6030) from Midland Highway in Barjang to Maroondah Highway in Maindample, and in 2013 re-declared the Midland Highway to begin at Corio-Waurn Ponds Road (Princes Highway) in Geelong and end at the Maroondah Highway in Mansfield.

Major intersections and towns

See also

 Highways in Australia
 Highways in Victoria

References

Highways in Australia
Highways in Victoria (Australia)
Transport in Geelong
Transport in Barwon South West (region)